Colonel Paul D. Logan served as a US Army Quartermaster before and during World War II as the Deputy Director of the Subsistence Division, Office of the Quartermaster General. His most notable accomplishment was the development of the "Logan Bar", or Ration D bar, an emergency chocolate ration manufactured by Hershey Chocolate. He was also responsible for the adoption of dehydrated potatoes and onions.

References

Year of birth missing
Year of death missing
Military food of the United States
United States Army officers
United States Army personnel of World War II
The Hershey Company